Probable G-protein coupled receptor 75 is a protein that in humans is encoded by the GPR75 gene.

Function 

GPR75 is a member of the G protein-coupled receptor family. GPRs are cell surface receptors that activate guanine-nucleotide binding proteins upon the binding of a ligand.

GPR75 is currently classified as an orphan GPCR and several studies are underway to identify its ligand. In one study, the chemokine CCL5 (RANTES) has been shown to stimulate calcium mobilization and inositol triphosphate formation in GPR75-transfected cells.

A 2021 study reported that people with protein-truncating variants of GPR75 were associated with 5.3kg lower body weight and 54% lower odds for obesity. GPR75 knock-out mice showed resistance to weight gain under high-fat diet.

References 

G protein-coupled receptors